Muhammad Kazim Maisam is a Pakistani politician who is member of the Gilgit Baltistan Assembly.

Political career
Maisam contested 2020 Gilgit-Baltistan Assembly election on 15 November 2020 from constituency GBA-8 (Skardu-II) on the ticket from Majlis Wahdat-e-Muslimeen. He won the election by the margin of 976 votes over the runner up Muhammad Ali Shah of Pakistan Peoples Party. He garnered 7,988 votes while Shah received 7,012 votes.

References

Living people
Gilgit-Baltistan MLAs 2020–2025
Politicians from Gilgit-Baltistan
Year of birth missing (living people)